Saraswatir Prem (The Lovelife of Saraswati) is an Indian Bengali television romantic comedy drama. The show aired on Bengali General Entertainment Channel Sun Bangla and is also available on digital platform Sun NXT, that premiered on 7 December 2020 and ended on 30 May 2021. It was generated by J D Productions Private Limited and starred by Pallavi Dey and Abhishek Veer Sharma.

Premise 
Belonging to a conservative family, Saraswati considers that love is equal to danger. In contrast, being only earning member of his family, Rohit considers that love is equal to money. 
Due to a complicate situation, Saraswati was forced to fake a marriage between her and Rohit but eventually they fall in love with each other. Then, how they face all the struggles while sticking together follows the crux of the story.

Cast

Main 

 Pallavi Dey as Saraswati Sen 
 Abhishek Veer Sharma as Rohit

Recurring 

 Sandip Dey as Sudip Sen: Saraswati's eldest paternal uncle
 Namita Chakraborty as Mala Sen: Sudip's wife
 Madhumita Tusii as Jamuna Sen: Sudip's daughter
 Krishnendu Adhikari as Rudra Sen: Saraswati's another elder paternal uncle.
 Nabonita Dey as Namita Sen, Rudra's wife
 Payel Deb as Ganga: Rudra's daughter
 Ananda Chowdhuri as Dipankar: Ganga's husband
 Judhajit Banerjee as Chunilal Sen: Saraswati's father
 Mayna Banerjee as Parbati Sen: Saraswati's mother
 Debjoy Mallick as Prabal Sen: Saraswati's younger paternal uncle
 Samata Das as Anu Sen: Prabal's wife
 Sagnik Koley as Pratik Sen: Prabal's son
 Biman Chakraborty as Bhima
Swastika Ghosh as Bubli: Rohit's younger sister
 Diganta Saha as Poltu, Rohit's best friend
Pritam Banerjee as Ahir;Jamuna love interest
Pratyush Kumar Bandyopadhyay as Anik (Poltu's Fake Friend)

References 

2020 Indian television series debuts
2020s romantic comedy television series
2020s comedy-drama television series
Sun Bangla original programming